The 1959 San Francisco Giants season was the Giants' 77th year in Major League Baseball and their second season  in San Francisco since their move from New York following the 1957 season. The team finished in third place in the National League with an 83–71 record, 4 games behind the World Champion Los Angeles Dodgers. It was the team's second and final season at Seals Stadium before moving their games to Candlestick Park the following season.

Offseason 
 October 8, 1958: Marv Grissom and Ernie Broglio were traded by the Giants to the St. Louis Cardinals for Hobie Landrith, Billy Muffett and Benny Valenzuela.
 December 3, 1958: Rubén Gómez and Valmy Thomas were traded by the Giants to the Philadelphia Phillies for Jack Sanford.
 December 5, 1958: Joey Amalfitano was released by the Giants.
 March 25, 1959: Ray Jablonski and Bill White were traded by the Giants to the St. Louis Cardinals for Sam Jones and Don Choate.

Regular season 
In his major league debut on July 30, Willie McCovey went four-for-four against future Hall-of-Famer Robin Roberts en route to a .354 batting average. McCovey went on to win National League Rookie of the Year honors while playing in just 52 games.

Season standings

Record vs. opponents

Opening Day starters 
Johnny Antonelli
Jackie Brandt
Orlando Cepeda
Jim Davenport
Willie Kirkland
Willie Mays
Andre Rodgers
Bob Schmidt
Daryl Spencer

Notable transactions 
 July 26, 1959: Billy Muffett and cash were traded by the Giants to the Boston Red Sox for Bud Byerly.
 August 25, 1959: Hank Sauer was released by the Giants.

Roster

Player stats

Batting

Starters by position 
Note: Pos = Position; G = Games played; AB = At bats; H = Hits; Avg. = Batting average; HR = Home runs; RBI = Runs batted in

Other batters 
Note: G = Games played; AB = At bats; H = Hits; Avg. = Batting average; HR = Home runs; RBI = Runs batted in

Pitching

Starting pitchers 
Note: G = Games pitched; IP = Innings pitched; W = Wins; L = Losses; ERA = Earned run average; SO = Strikeouts

Other pitchers 
Note: G = Games pitched; IP = Innings pitched; W = Wins; L = Losses; ERA = Earned run average; SO = Strikeouts

Relief pitchers 
Note: G = Games pitched; W = Wins; L = Losses; SV = Saves; ERA = Earned run average; SO = Strikeouts

Awards and honors 
 Willie McCovey – National League Rookie of the Year

All-Star Game (first game)
All-Star Game (second game)

Farm system 

LEAGUE CHAMPIONS: Springfield

Notes

References 
 1959 San Francisco Giants team page at Baseball Reference
 1959 San Francisco Giants team page at Baseball Almanac

San Francisco Giants seasons
San Francisco Giants season
1959 in sports in California